Zheng Shengxiong (born 5 January 1999) is a Chinese footballer currently playing as a midfielder for Guangzhou.

Career statistics

Club
.

References

1999 births
Living people
Chinese footballers
Association football midfielders
China League One players
Chinese Super League players
Guangzhou F.C. players
Sichuan Jiuniu F.C. players